Techno-progressivism or tech-progressivism is a stance of active support for the convergence of technological change and social change. Techno-progressives argue that technological developments can be profoundly empowering and emancipatory when they are regulated by legitimate democratic and accountable authorities to ensure that their costs, risks and benefits are all fairly shared by the actual stakeholders to those developments. One of the first mentions of techno-progressivism appeared within extropian jargon in 1999 as the removal of "all political, cultural, biological, and psychological limits to self-actualization and self-realization".

Stance
Techno-progressivism maintains that accounts of progress should focus on scientific and technical dimensions, as well as ethical and social ones.  For most techno-progressive perspectives, then, the growth of scientific knowledge or the accumulation of technological powers will not represent the achievement of proper progress unless and until it is accompanied by a just distribution of the costs, risks, and benefits of these new knowledges and capacities.  At the same time, for most techno-progressive critics and advocates, the achievement of better democracy, greater fairness, less violence, and a wider rights culture are all desirable, but inadequate in themselves to confront the quandaries of contemporary technological societies unless and until they are accompanied by progress in science and technology to support and implement these values.

Strong techno-progressive positions include support for the civil right of a person to either maintain or modify his or her own mind and body, on his or her own terms, through informed, consensual recourse to, or refusal of, available therapeutic or enabling biomedical technology.

During the November 2014 Transvision Conference, many of the leading transhumanist organizations signed the Technoprogressive Declaration. The Declaration stated the values of technoprogressivism.

Contrasting stance

Bioconservatism (a portmanteau word combining "biology" and "conservatism") is a stance of hesitancy about technological development especially if it is perceived to threaten a given social order. Strong bioconservative positions include opposition to genetic modification of food crops, the cloning and genetic engineering of livestock and pets, and, most prominently, rejection of the genetic, prosthetic, and cognitive modification of human beings to overcome what are broadly perceived as current human biological and cultural limitations.

Bioconservatives range in political perspective from right-leaning religious and cultural conservatives to left-leaning environmentalists and technology critics. What unifies bioconservatives is skepticism about medical and other biotechnological transformations of the living world. Typically less sweeping as a critique of technological society than bioluddism, the bioconservative perspective is characterized by its defense of the natural, deployed as a moral category.

Although techno-progressivism is the stance which contrasts with bioconservatism in the biopolitical spectrum, both techno-progressivism and bioconservatism, in their more moderate expressions, share an opposition to unsafe, unfair, undemocratic forms of technological development, and both recognize that such developmental modes can facilitate unacceptable recklessness and exploitation, exacerbate injustice and incubate dangerous social discontent.

List of notable techno-progressive social critics

Technocritic Dale Carrico with his accounts of techno-progressivism
Philosopher Donna Haraway with her accounts of cyborg theory.
Media theorist Douglas Rushkoff with his accounts of open source.
Cultural critic Mark Dery and his accounts of cyberculture.
Science journalist Chris Mooney with his account of the U.S. Republican Party's "war on science".
Futurist Bruce Sterling with his Viridian design movement.
Futurist Alex Steffen and his accounts of bright green environmentalism through the Worldchanging blog.
Science journalist Annalee Newitz with her accounts of the Biopunk.
Bioethicist James Hughes of the Institute for Ethics and Emerging Technologies with his accounts of democratic transhumanism.

Controversy
Technocritic Dale Carrico, who has used "techno-progressive" as a shorthand to describe progressive politics that emphasize technoscientific issues, has expressed concern that some "transhumanists" are using the term to describe themselves, with the consequence of possibly misleading the public regarding their actual cultural, social and political views, which may or may not be compatible with critical techno-progressivism.

See also

Algocracy
Body modification
Bioethics
Biopolitics
Digital freedom
Free software movement
 Frontierism
 Fordism
 High modernism
 Manifest Destiny
 New Frontier
 Post-scarcity economy
 Scientism
 Technocentrism
 Technological progress
Techno-utopianism
Transhumanist politics
Progress

References

External links
Institute for Ethics and Emerging Technologies
Overview of Biopolitics

Ideologies
Technology in society
Political ideologies
Progressivism
Humanism
Science and technology studies
Transhumanism
Ethics
Transhumanist politics